Bathtime may refer to:

 A time to bathe

Television

Episodes
 "Bathtime", an episode of the television series Astro Farm
 "Bathtime", an episode of the television series Go Baby!
 "Bathtime", an episode of the television series Shaun the Sheep
 "Bathtime", an episode of the television series Sooty Show
 "Bathtime", an episode of the television series The Cat in the Hat Knows a Lot About That! as well as one of the show's DVDs
 "Bathtime", an episode of the television series The Simpsons shorts
 "Bathtime", an episode of the television series The Tracey Ullman Show
 "Bathtime", an episode of the television series Zoboomafoo

Music
 "Bathtime", a song in the album Coliseu dos Recreios de Lisboa – October 30th, 2001
 "Bathtime", a song in the album Everything Grows
 "Bathtime", a song in the album Raffi in Concert with the Rise and Shine Band
 "Bathtime", a single by Tindersticks
 "Bathtime", a song in the album Toot, Toot!

Other
 Bathtime, a book by Joy Berry in the Teach Me About book series

See also
 Bath (disambiguation)